The Eagle House is a historic house at 217 Ash Street in Lonoke, Arkansas.  It is a large two story Bungalow/Craftsman style house, with a cross-gable roof configuration, and an exterior of yellow brick and half-timbered stucco. A long single-story porch extends across the front, supported by brick piers and large curved brackets.  The house was designed by architect Charles L. Thompson and built in 1915.

The house was listed on the National Register of Historic Places in 1982.

See also
National Register of Historic Places listings in Lonoke County, Arkansas

References

Houses on the National Register of Historic Places in Arkansas
Houses completed in 1915
Houses in Lonoke County, Arkansas
National Register of Historic Places in Lonoke County, Arkansas
Buildings and structures in Lonoke, Arkansas